Huang Yizhong (born August 24, 1981) is a Chinese professional Go player.

Biography 
Huang began playing Go at the age of 7. By the time he turned 11, he had entered his province's Go team. At 14, he was a part of the National Youth Go Team. Huang turned professional in 1994, a year before joining the team. He is currently 7 dan, since 2008. His biggest accomplishment was winning the Tianyuan title in 2002 over Chang Hao, which ended Chang Hao's five year-run with the title. However, Huang lost the title the next year to Gu Li, who has now held it for four years straight.

Past titles and runners-up

Notes

External links
GoGameWorld Profile

Living people
1981 births
Chinese Go players
Sportspeople from Changsha